The United States census of 1820 was the fourth census conducted in the United States. It was conducted on August 7, 1820.  The 1820 census included six new states: Louisiana, Indiana, Mississippi, Illinois, Alabama and Maine.  There has been a district wide loss of 1820 census records for Arkansas Territory, Missouri Territory and New Jersey.

The total population was determined to be 9,638,453, of which 1,538,022 were slaves.  The center of population was about 120 miles (193 km) west-northwest of Washington in Hardy County, Virginia (now in West Virginia).

This was the first census in which any states recorded a population of over one millionNew York, Virginia, and Pennsylvaniaas well as the first in which a city recorded a population of over 100,000New York. It was also the first census in which Baltimore was ranked as the country's second-most populous city. Thirdly, in this census and the 14 subsequent ones, New York was the most populous state until being superseded by California in the 1970 census.

Census questions

The 1820 census contains a great deal more information than previous censuses. Enumerators listed the following data in columns, left to right:

 Name of the head of family
  of free white males under age 10
  of free white males age 10 to under 16
  of free white males age 16 to 18
  of free white males age 16 to under 26
  of free white males age 26 to under 45
  of free white males age 45 and up
  of free white females under age 10
  of free white females age 10 to under 16
  of free white females age 16 to under 26
  of free white females age 26 to under 45
  of free white females age 45 and up
  of foreigners not naturalized
  of persons engaged in agriculture
  of persons engaged in commerce
  of persons engaged in manufacture
  of male slaves under 14
  of male slaves age 14 to under 26
  of male slaves age 26 to under 45
  of male slaves age 45 and up
  of female slaves under 14
  of female slaves age 14 to under 26
  of female slaves age 26 to under 45
  of female slaves age 45 and up
  of free male colored persons under 14
  of free male colored persons age 14 to under 26
  of free male colored persons age 26 to under 45
  of free male colored persons age 45 and up
  of free female colored persons under 14
  of free female colored persons age 14 to under 26
  of free female colored persons age 26 to under 45
  of free female colored persons age 45 and up
  of all other persons except Indians not taxed

Several of these columns were for special counts, and not to be included in the aggregate total.  Doing so would have resulted in counting some individuals twice.  Census takers were asked to use double lines, red ink or some other method of distinguishing these columns so that double counting would not occur.  For example, the count of free white males between 16 and 18 was a special count, because these individuals were also supposed to be tabulated in the column for free white males of age 16 and under 26.

The other special counts were foreigners not naturalized, persons engaged in agriculture, persons engaged in commerce, and persons engaged in manufacture.

Census takers were also instructed to count each individual in only one of the occupational columns.  For example, if an individual was engaged in agriculture, commerce, and manufacture, the census taker had to judge which one the individual was primarily engaged in.

Note to researchers

Censustaking was not yet an exact science. Before 1830, enumerators lacked pre-printed forms, and drew up their own, sometimes resulting in pages without headings, line tallies, or column totals. As a result, census records for many towns before 1830 are idiosyncratic. This is not to suggest that they are less reliable than subsequent censuses, but that they may require more work on the part of the researcher.

State rankings

Notes

City rankings

References

Notes on references

External links
 Census for 1820 Contains links to 1820 census results
 Historic US Census data

United States Census, 1820
United States census
United States